The SP AF 90mm 2.8 Di 1:1 Macro lens is a macro lens produced by Tamron. It comes in the Canon EF-mount, Nikon F-mount, Pentax K-mount, and Sony A-mount. The lens was released in 1997. It received the European "Lens of the Year: 1997-1998" award. It was mechanically and cosmetically upgraded in February 2000. The lens is known for its high optical quality and reasonable price.

References

External links
AF 90mm F/2.8 Di 1:1 Macro; Lenses; Tamron USA, inc.

90
Macro lenses